Francis Smith may refer to:

Government and politics 
Francis Smith (by 1516-1605), Member of Parliament (MP) for Truro and Stafford
Francis Smith, 2nd Viscount Carrington (c. 1621 – 1701), English peer
Francis Ormand Jonathan Smith (1806–1876), US Representative from Maine
Francis Smith (Australian politician) (1819–1909), former Premier of Tasmania
Frank Smith (British politician) (1854–1940), MP for Nuneaton, 1929–1931
Francis Henry Smith (1868–1936), Reform Party Member of Parliament in New Zealand
Francis Smith (Missouri politician) (1905–1984), American politician from Missouri
Francis R. Smith (1911–1982), U.S. Representative from Pennsylvania

Military 
Francis Smith (British Army officer) (1723–1791), British officer during the American Revolutionary War
Francis Henney Smith (1812–1890), first Superintendent of the Virginia Military Institute
Francis Smith (RAAF officer) (1896–1961), Australian World War I flying ace
Francis N. Smith (born 1930), rear admiral in the United States Navy

Business 
Francis Pettit Smith (1808–1874), British inventor of the screw propeller
Francis Shubael Smith (1819–1887), American publisher
Francis Marion Smith (1846–1931), American borax magnate

Sports and entertainment 
Frank Smith (rugby union) (Francis Bede Smith; 1886–1954), Australian rugby union player
Fran Smith Jr. (born 1952), bass guitarist for The Hooters
Francie Larrieu Smith (born 1952), American track and field athlete

Science and academia 
Francis Graham-Smith (born 1923), British astronomer
Francis Hopkinson Smith (1838–1915), American author, artist and engineer
Francis P. Smith (Duquesne University) (1907–1990), American Catholic priest and university president
Francis Smith of Warwick (1672–1738), English architect
Francis Smith (explorer), captain of an exploration vessel, during the Northwest Passage expedition of 1746

Others
Francis Wilford-Smith (1927–2009), British cartoonist, graphic artist, and producer and archivist of blues music
Francis Smith (priest) (fl. 1917–1959), South African Anglican priest
Francis Palmer Smith (1886–1971), American architect based in Atlanta, Georgia, also known as Francis P. Smith
Francis Smith (judge) (1847–1912), Sierra Leonean judge in the Gold Coast
Francis Jagoe Smith (1873–1969), Postmaster General of Ceylon

See also 
Frank Smith (disambiguation)
Frances Smith (disambiguation)